Murali Krishna Thalluri (born 4 August 1984) is an Australian film director, writer, and producer.

Born in Canberra to Indian-born parents (Telugu), he moved to Adelaide where he attended Rostrevor College before completing his education at University Senior College.

His first feature film, 2:37, was completed when he was 22 years old and financed via private funding. It was screened at a number of international film festivals including the 2006 Cannes Film Festival, the Melbourne International Film Festival, the Toronto International Film Festival and the Tokyo International Film Festival.

Filmography

 2:37 (2006)

References

External links

Profile, deadline.com, May 2013; accessed 15 August 2015.

1984 births
Living people
People educated at Rostrevor College
Australian film directors
Australian film producers
Australian film editors
Australian people of Indian descent
Writers from Adelaide